Bradley Steede Kamdem Fewo (born 18 August 1994) is a French footballer who plays as a left back for Valletta in the Maltese league.

Early life
Born in Paris, Kamdem grew up in Calgary, Alberta. He would play his youth football with the Calgary Chinooks youth club, and played for Western Canada High School for all 3 years of his high school career.

Career

College and amateur
Kamdem played four years of college soccer, including one year at Huntington University in 2012 before transferring to the University of Nevada, Las Vegas in 2013. Kamdem played with Premier Development League side Calgary Foothills FC in 2015.

Professional 
Kamdem was drafted in the third round of the 2016 MLS SuperDraft (58th overall) by Colorado Rapids. However, he didn't sign with Colorado, instead joining United Soccer League side Rochester Rhinos in March 2016. In December 2016, Rochester announced that Kamdem would return for the 2017 season. In June 2017, he would score his first professional goal in a 1-0 win against FC Cincinnati. Kamdem would play two seasons with Rochester, before the club announced they would not play in the 2018 USL season.

Kamdem signed with USL club Fresno FC for the 2018 season.

Kamdem was signed by Saint Louis FC in January 2019.

References

External links

 
 Bradley Kamdem at UNLV Rebels

1994 births
Living people
French footballers
French expatriate footballers
French expatriate sportspeople in the United States
UNLV Rebels men's soccer players
Calgary Foothills FC players
Rochester New York FC players
Fresno FC players
Saint Louis FC players
Atlanta United 2 players
Association football defenders
Expatriate soccer players in the United States
Colorado Rapids draft picks
USL League Two players
USL Championship players
Footballers from Paris
Huntington Foresters
Huntington University (United States) alumni